Steve McCahill (born 3 September 1966) was a Scottish footballer who played for Dumbarton, Celtic and  Morton.

Career
McCahill began his senior career at Boghead playing for Dumbarton and spent nearly five years there, making nearly 150 league appearances for the club. McCahill impressed in a Scottish Cup tie against Celtic in January 1989 and signed for the club a couple of days later.

McCahill made his debut for Celtic on 25 February 1989, coming on as a second-half substitute in a 3–0 win over Dundee at Dens Park.  He made a further 4 league appearances for Celtic that season and also played in the Dubai Champions Cup match against Liverpool on 4 April 1989, in which he turned in a highly impressive performance which helped Celtic to a win on penalties after the match had finished 1–1. However, McCahill sustained a fractured jaw in league match against Motherwell on 12 April 1989. McCahill featured rarely for Celtic after that and left on a free transfer to Morton in October 1992.

McCahill played regularly for Morton for the next few years and won a Scottish Second Division league medal in 1995.

References

External links
 Steve McCahill, The Celtic Wiki
 McCahill's Celtic move fulfills boyhood dream, HeraldScotland

1966 births
Living people
Footballers from Greenock
Association football defenders
Scottish footballers
Dumbarton F.C. players
Celtic F.C. players
Greenock Morton F.C. players
Scottish Football League players